Safari World is a tourist attraction in Bangkok, Thailand that consists of two parks named Marine Park and Safari Park, operated by Safari World Public Limited. A major renovation to enhance effectiveness of land use began on 17 April 1989 and its total area developed for the leisure park now consists of an open zoo and a marine park on 500 rai (approximately 200 acres) of land.

On 1 February 1994, Safari World changed its name to Safari World Public Company Limited. Later, it was accepted by the Stock Exchange of Thailand (SET) to become the first and only entertainment park to be listed on SET on 16 February 1995.

Safari Park

Safari Park is the largest section of the park. It is a 50 minutes drive-thru through an eight kilometer park replicating a Savannah habitat. The safari park houses large herds of Asian and African ungulates and a very large free flying waterbirds sanctuary. The main drive thru area houses large herds of herbivores, with up to 100 individuals of a single species. There is a large herd of Masai giraffe with more than 200 individuals. Other animals include herds of Grant's zebra, Black wildebeest, Impala, White rhinoceros, Nyala, Sitatunga, Ankole cattle, Cape buffalo, Gemsbok, Hippopotamus and Ostrich. A large number of Asian ungulates are also mixed with African hoofstock like Indian gaur, Nilgai, Blackbuck, Sambar deer, Indian hog deer, Fallow deer, Eld's deer and Spotted deer and Dromedary camel. The large waterbirds sanctuary surrounding the park houses a vast number of Great white pelican, Painted stork, Marabou stork, grey crowned crane and other birds. 
The carnivores have separate drive-throughs separated using gates. There are African lions, Bengal tiger, Asian black bear and American black bear.

Marine Park

Marine Park is the main park where various animal displays from all over the world are showcased. The main attractions of Safari World are located in Marine Park. Seven shows take place daily at different times, Dolphin show, Spy War show, Orangutan boxing show, Bird Show, Cowboy stunt show, Elephant show and Sea lion show. Other attractions at the Marine Park included Jungle cruise and Safari terrace, where visitors could feed hundreds of giraffes with bananas and leaves. The Marine Park has a walk-thru aviary called Mini world where visitors could feed hundreds of free flying sun conures on their hands. Mini World also has an aviary for Caribbean flamingoes, Wood duck and mandarin duck. Mini world aviary is the star attraction at Marine Park. Another aviary called Hornbill jungle with Great Indian hornbill, Wreathed hornbill, Oriental pied hornbill, Rhinoceros hornbill, Nicobar pigeon, Pied imperial pigeon and White-crowned hornbill is also there. There is another Macaw aviary with huge flocks of scarlet macaw, hyacinth macaw, Red-and-green macaw and Blue-and-yellow macaw. There are enclosures for marsupials like Red kangaroos, Agile wallaby and Bennett's wallaby, as well as for Australian birds like Emu and Southern cassowary.

Another exhibit called Tiger kingdom has enclosures for Bengal tiger, White tiger and Siberian tiger. Near the giraffe terrace are exhibits for Ring tailed lemur, Black-and-white ruffed lemur and manatees. Besides mammals there are over 100 aviaries for small birds for avifauna spread throughout the park.

Beside  the sea lion show theatre is an exhibit for malayan tapir. Other exhibits in the park include capybara, African porcupine, Puma, Leopard, Walrus, Mandrill, common marmoset, pygmy hippopotamus, Red-shanked douc langur, Cape fur seal, Binturong, White handed gibbon, Prairie dog and Linnaeus's two-toed sloth. A very large exhibit housing a very large group of siamese crocodiles is also there with separate exhibits for false gharial and a monster-sized saltwater crocodile. Large aquariums for exotic freshwater fishes like arapaima and Mekong giant catfish are spread throughout the park. A large lake in which paddle-boat could be done by visitors is filled with White Swan and Black Swan.

Controversy 

There has been controversy about Safari World for its treatment of animals. Their operation came under international scrutiny when their treatment of animals, particularly orangutans and elephants, and keeping lion and tiger cubs in cramped cages. The treatment of orangutans came to the attention of Jim and Allison Cronin, founders of Monkey World and avid animal rights campaigners and other animal rights groups such as PETA, as well as being featured in a 2013 episode of the British animal rescue show Wildlife SOS.

See also 
 Dream World (Thai amusement park)
 Siam Park City

References

External links
 
 Sister park in Phuket

Safari parks
Zoos in Thailand
Amusement parks in Thailand
Buildings and structures in Bangkok
Tourist attractions in Bangkok
Companies listed on the Stock Exchange of Thailand
1988 establishments in Thailand
Zoos established in 1988
Khlong Sam Wa district